Ilona Berecz (born 16 December 1947) is a Hungarian ice dancing coach and former competitor. With István Sugár, she is a two-time Hungarian national champion and the 1968 Blue Swords bronze medalist. They finished in the top ten at three European Championships.

Personal life 
Berecz was born 16 December 1947 in Budapest, Hungary. She married Hungarian ice hockey player Mátyás Vedres.

Career 
Berecz switched from singles to ice dancing when she was sixteen years old. She competed in partnership with István Sugár. The duo finished in the top ten at the 1969 European Championships in Garmisch-Partenkirchen, West Germany; 1970 European Championships in Leningrad, Soviet Union; and 1971 European Championships in Zürich, Switzerland. They competed at three World Championships; their best result, 12th, came in 1970 (Ljubljana, Yugoslavia). They won two Hungarian national titles.

During her competitive career, Berecz was a member of Ferencvárosi TC. She later coached ice dancing at Budapest Spartacus for three decades, beginning in 1974. Her former students include:
 Klára Engi / Attila Tóth
 Zita Gebora / András Visontai
 Judit Péterfy / Csaba Bálint
 Gabriella Remport / Sándor Nagy
 Dóra Turóczi / Balázs Major

From 1980 to 1995, Berecz served as the head of the ice dancing division at the Hungarian National Skating Federation.

Competitive highlights 
With Sugár

References 

1947 births
Hungarian figure skating coaches
Hungarian female ice dancers
Living people
Figure skaters from Budapest